Rhodesia alboviridata, the frosted emerald, is a species of moth of the family Geometridae first described by Max Saalmüller in 1880. It is found in southern Africa and Madagascar.

Known food plants of this species are Carissa edulis and Bauhinia variegata.

References
Saalmüller, M. (1880). "Neue Lepidopteren aus Madagascar, die sich in Museum der Senckenberg'schen naturforschenden Gesellschaft befinden". Bericht über die Senckenbergische Naturforschende Gesellschaft in Frankfurt a.M. 1879–1880: 258–310.

Geometrinae
Moths described in 1880
Moths of Madagascar
Moths of Africa